This list of iron ore mines in Australia is subsidiary to the list of mines article and lists working, defunct and planned mines in the country organised by state.

Western Australia

Pilbara

Esperance Port

Geraldton / Mid West

Offshore islands 

 Koolan Island
 Koolan Island mine

South Australia 
Cairn Hill mine
Iron Baron
Iron Duke
 Iron Knob, South Australia
Iron Monarch
Iron Prince
Peculiar Knob - mothballed by Arrium in 2015
Port Adelaide (multi-commodity port, export port for Cairn Hill ore)
Whyalla port and Whyalla Steelworks (Processing plant and export port for iron ore and steel products)

Northern Territory 

 Frances Creek
 Union Reef - rail to Darwin

Proposed 
 New South Wales
 Lockhart - Standard Mining.

References 

Iron ore mines in Australia
iron mines